Storå ("Large Creek") or Storåen is Denmark's second longest creek, spanning , and only surpassed by Gudenå. Storå originates southeast of Ikast, winding its way between Herning, Sunds, and Ørre. Then it winds through Nybro, Hodsager and Holstebro before ending up in Nissum Fjord.

Storå is one of Denmark's major creeks. Only Gudenå, Skjern Creek and Vid Creek are more water-rich. This includes the sources of Vegen Creek and Lægård Bæk, both of which end in Storå in Holstebro's city center.

About half of that evaporates, and the rest of it runs off through Storå via ground water and surface drainage. There must therefore be 0.4 m2 x 825 km2 = 330 million m3 of water flowing through Holstebro city every year. Recent years have witnessed a slight increase in rainfall in West Jutland.

After Ørre, the river is so wide that it is possible to kayak. In Ørre, Sunds Nørreå comes together with Herningholms Creek, so the water volume increases. After the city Vemb, the creek Lille å is added onto the river.

In Holstebro, one can become a member of Kajakklubben Pagaj ("The Paddle Kayak Club") to rent a kayak and take a rowing tour.

In Herning and Holstebro one can rent canoes from the tourist offices. It takes about three times as long to row the tour by canoe as by kayak.

In the western city boundary of Holstebro one can play golf at GOLFCLUB Storådalen's challenging courses, with water in play in 15 out of 18 holes.

External sources/references
 Kajakklubben Pagaj
 GOLFCLUB Storådalen

Rivers of Jutland